Huntsville International is the third studio album by American hip hop duo G-Side. It was released by Slow Motion Soundz on November 18, 2009.

Critical reception

David Drake of Pitchfork gave the album a 7.7 out of 10, writing, "G-Side are artists who thrive in a world of decentralized discourse, who don't transcend their audience but who can upend the expectations of even the most jaded rap heads, if they give them a chance."

Cokemachineglow placed it at number 38 on the "Top 50 Albums 2009" list.

Track listing

References

Further reading

External links
 

2009 albums
G-Side albums